Bauchau is a surname. Notable people with the surname include:

Henry Bauchau (1913–2012), Belgian psychoanalyst, lawyer, and author
Oliver Bauchau, American aerospace engineer
Patrick Bauchau (born 1938), Belgian actor

French-language surnames
Surnames of Belgian origin